Andrew John Pugh (born 28 January 1989) is an English professional footballer who plays as a striker for Phoenix Sports.

Career
Pugh signed scholarship forms with Gillingham in 2005 and made his debut as a substitute in a home defeat to Brighton & Hove Albion on 20 February 2007.
It was announced on 8 May 2007 that Pugh had signed his first professional contract, a one-year deal with option of another year. In October 2007 he joined Welling United on a one-month loan deal. On 15 February, Pugh joined Maidstone United on a month's loan.

In August 2008, Pugh joined Folkestone Invicta on a one-month loan deal to gain first-team experience, and had another loan spell later the same season at Grays Athletic. Pugh made his debut for Grays starting in the 1–1 home draw against Weymouth. His loan spell at Grays was extended until the end of the 2008–09 season, despite Gillingham manager Mark Stimson's wishes to recall him. Pugh was sent-off in Grays' 2–1 away defeat on 13 April, ruling him out of the last three games of the Conference National season.

In September 2009, Pugh joined Dover Athletic on a month's loan after Andy Hessenthaler's side were hampered by injuries. Pugh scored a debut goal for Dover in a 4–2 victory over Hampton & Richmond Borough. Welling United re-signed Pugh on a one-month loan deal in November. In March 2010, Pugh joined Conference National side Histon on loan for a month. His contract at Gillingham finished at the end of that season, and was not renewed.
After his Gillingham contract finished Pugh, along with Luis Cumbers, signed for Welling.

On 25 January 2012, Pugh signed for Cambridge United on a two and a half-year contract for a fee of £15,000. The transfer was protracted throughout the January transfer window as Pugh was unable to take a medical at the  due to a knee injury. On 9 January 2014, Pugh had signed a one-month loan deal to join Dartford alongside fellow Cambridge United player Rory McAuley. He was recalled back to the Abbey Stadium on 14 February 2014, ready to take part in the club's FA Trophy semi-final against Grimsby Town. Pugh was released by Cambridge on 27 May 2014.

On 23 August 2019, Pugh joined East Thurrock United on dual registration terms.

On 28 February 2020, Pugh joined Sevenoaks Town on dual registration terms.

On 22 June 2020, Pugh joined Chatham Town ahead of the 2020–21 season.

Career statistics

Notes

Honours
Cambridge United

FA Trophy: 2013–14

References

External links
Gillingham profile
Welling United profile

1989 births
English footballers
Living people
Gillingham F.C. players
Folkestone Invicta F.C. players
Maidstone United F.C. players
Welling United F.C. players
Grays Athletic F.C. players
Dover Athletic F.C. players
Histon F.C. players
Ebbsfleet United F.C. players
Dartford F.C. players
Cambridge United F.C. players
English Football League players
National League (English football) players
Isthmian League players
Association football forwards
Sportspeople from Gravesend, Kent